Doctor Dolittle and the Secret Lake is a Doctor Dolittle book written by Hugh Lofting. The book was published posthumously in 1948, 15 years after its predecessor. Fittingly, it is the longest book in the series, and the tone is the darkest; World War II took place before the book was published, during which Lofting had published his 1942 anti-war poem Victory for the Slain. The book contains passages that almost border on being misanthropic with some very powerful passages concerning war and Man's inhumanity to man.

Style
The book starts with the Doctor giving up his dream of lengthening human life with discoveries he made on the Moon, and showing signs of despair. The tone of the passages for the first time acknowledges 'nature red in tooth and claw': another of the Doctor's experiments, a house where scavengers and parasites can live without harming other creatures, is also doomed to failure.

The Doctor then receives an urgent call to rescue what is literally his oldest friend: Mudface the Giant Turtle, who was a passenger on Noah's Ark. Mudface's tale of the Great Flood is told, which was missing from Lofting's 1923 novel Doctor Dolittle's Post Office. Mudface's account of the Flood and its aftermath takes up most of the book, and it is by no means a jolly story. There are many references to genocide and slavery, including a passage where animals gather outside a hut to devour the humans inside (a young man and his beloved, who are the most sympathetic characters next to Mudface and his mate).

Comedy is reduced to a mere sprinkling, just enough to lighten some of the more dark passages. The book stands alone in style but with, arguably, some of Hugh Lofting's most powerful writing.

Also of note is that Lofting's depiction of African characters is far less caricatured than in previous novels.

External links
 

1948 British novels
1948 fantasy novels
Secret Lake
British children's novels
Novels about Noah's Ark
Novels published posthumously
J. B. Lippincott & Co. books
Novels set in Africa
1948 children's books